Casement Park is the principal Gaelic games stadium in Belfast, Northern Ireland, and serves as the home ground of the Antrim football and hurling teams. It is located in Andersonstown Road in the west of the city, and named after the republican revolutionary Sir Roger Casement (1864-1916).  it had an official capacity of 32,282, with safety certification for 31,661, including 6,962 seated. As of 2021, the stadium was closed and in a state of dereliction, with redevelopment plans pending for several years. In July 2021, formal planning permission for the redevelopment of Casement Park was confirmed.

History
Casement Park, one of the largest stadia in Ulster, opened in June 1953, with Armagh Harps defeating St John’s of Antrim in the final of the inaugural Ulster Senior Club Football Championship. The newly opened Casement Park hosted the Ulster Championship final less than a month later, which saw Armagh overcome reigning All-Ireland champions Cavan.

The ground's location in a republican neighbourhood saw incidents during the Troubles which contributed to unionist perception of the Gaelic Athletic Association (GAA) as pro-republican. Rallies against the introduction of internment were held on 12 September 1971 and 19 March 1972.  It was occupied by the British Army from  Operation Motorman on 31 July 1972 until October 1973. Provisional IRA members displayed weapons at a rally there in August 1979. In March 1988, two Army corporals who drove into a republican funeral cortège were interrogated in Casement Park before being shot on nearby waste ground. Anniversaries of the 1981 hunger strike were marked by rallies at the stadium in 2001 and 2006, against the wishes of the GAA Central Council.

In all, Casement Park has hosted eight Ulster football finals. However, the Antrim ground has not held the provincial final since 1971, with St. Tiernach's Park in Clones hosting the final every year since except between 2004 and 2006 when it was moved to Croke Park such was the demand for tickets.  A major facelift of the stadium took place in 2000, a move which saw more championship games played at Casement Park. In 2006, floodlights were added which allowed hurling and football to be played in the evening.

In November 2016, Casement Park was included as part of Ireland's 2023 Rugby World Cup bid, which in 2017 lost to France. The stadium was also reportedly "mentioned as a possible [venue]" in connection with Northern Ireland's joint UEFA Euro 2028 bid.

Redevelopment
In 2006, proposals were raised to build a new multi-purpose stadium on the site of the old Maze prison near Lisburn, which was intended to host association football, rugby union and Gaelic games. However, opposition to the idea led to it being dropped in favour of a new venue in the Sydenham area of East Belfast. This led to Ulster GAA, which was one of the partners in the Maze project, to pull out in favour of remaining at Casement Park.

Plans to redevelop Casement Park were announced in 2009, though it was not until 2011 that the Northern Ireland Executive announced that it had granted £138m for various stadium redevelopment projects throughout Northern Ireland, of which Ulster GAA would receive £61.4m to be used to redevelop Casement Park into a 40,000 all-seated stadium. A further £15 million was proposed from the Central Council of the Gaelic Athletic Association. If the plans had been approved, the venue would become the largest stadium in Ulster. In early 2012 it was announced that the redevelopment work would start at the end of 2013 with a view to having the new stadium open by September 2015. It was expected that, after its completion, Ulster GAA would move its headquarters from St Tiernach's Park in Clones to the redeveloped Casement Park.

Local residents of West Belfast objected to the proposal and in September 2013 the Mooreland and Owenvarragh Residents Association (MORA) issued a formal petition and letter of objection to the Northern Ireland Department of Environment, describing the new stadium plans "a monstrosity" and too expansive. The residents filed a lawsuit as the date for the commencement of construction continued to be delayed. In December 2014 the High Court ruled a ministerial decision granting planning approval for the redevelopment of the stadium was unlawful, setting the proposal back further. Ulster GAA responded with disappointment to the decision, though vowed to re-submit an improved design. They did so in October 2016, unveiling a smaller scale project with a reduced capacity of 34,500. This design was unable to achieve planning approval permission, as Northern Ireland's power-sharing government was dissolved in March 2017. This delay saw the anticipated total cost of the project increase to approximately £110 million.

Antrim's 14 point "home" loss to Tyrone in the 2019 Ulster Senior Football Championship quarter-final in Armagh highlighted the run-down status of the Casement Park pitch and grandstands. The GAA stated it was hopeful of receiving planning permission for the redevelopment in mid-Spring 2020. This eventually came in October 2020 when Minister for Infrastructure Nichola Mallon recommended planning approval. As of 2020, the stadium was scheduled to open in summer 2023, while the project still faced funding uncertainties. 

In July 2021, planning permission for the redevelopment of Casement Park was confirmed. At that time, the redevelopment project (including a proposed capacity of 34,578) was set to commence in the first half of 2022 and expected to be a two-year build. However, the planning approval was subject to a High Court review, and in May 2022 an appeal against the stadium's redevelopment was rejected by the court, with work projected to begin in 2023.

See also
 List of Gaelic Athletic Association stadiums
 List of stadiums in Ireland by capacity
 Match for Michaela

References

Antrim GAA
Gaelic games grounds in Northern Ireland
Sports venues completed in 1953
Sports venues in Belfast